Rhyzodiastes mishmicus is a species of ground beetle in the subfamily Rhysodinae. It was described by Gilbert John Arrow in 1942. It is found in Assam (Northeast India).

References

Rhyzodiastes
Beetles of Asia
Insects of India
Beetles described in 1942
Taxa named by Gilbert John Arrow